Madonna and Child Enthroned with Saints is a 1536-1537 oil on canvas painting by Moretto da Brescia, now on one of the side altars in the church of Sant'Andrea in Bergamo.

It shows Saints Eusebia, Andrew, Domno and Domneone.

References

1530s paintings
Paintings of the Madonna and Child by Moretto da Brescia
Paintings in Bergamo
Paintings depicting Andrew the Apostle